Mucilaginibacter ginsengisoli is a  Gram-negative, strictly aerobic, short-rod-shaped and non-motile bacterium from the genus of Mucilaginibacter which has been isolated from soil which was cultivated with ginseng.

References

Sphingobacteriia
Bacteria described in 2015